Timothy Kenyon Cotton (February 23, 1974 – July 23, 2010) was a fullback for the Baltimore Ravens of the NFL.

College
He played college football at ULL.

NFL career
Cotton played two years in the NFL, both with the Ravens. He had a career total four attempts, 10 yards, a 2.5 average per carry, and one touchdown.

Death
On July 17, 2010, Cotton died from complications resulting from Achilles tendon surgery.

References

1974 births
2010 deaths
Baltimore Ravens players
Players of American football from Louisiana
Sportspeople from Bossier City, Louisiana
American football fullbacks
Louisiana Ragin' Cajuns football players